Lake McDonald is the largest  lake in Glacier National Park. Lake McDonald is approximately 10 miles (16 km) long, and over a mile (1.6 km) wide and 472 feet (130 m) deep, filling a valley formed by a combination of erosion and glacial activity. Going-to-the-Sun Road parallels the lake along its southern shoreline. The surface area of the lake is 6,823 acres (27.6 km2).

The lake is home to numerous native species of trout, and other game fish.  Catchable species include: westslope cutthroat trout, rainbow trout, bull trout (char), lake trout (char), Lake Superior whitefish, mountain whitefish, kokanee salmon (landlocked sockeye), and suckers.  However, the lake is nutrient-poor and is not considered a prime fishing destination. Grizzly bears, black bear, moose, and mule deer are found in many places near the lake but are most common on the north shore. The lake is surrounded by a dense coniferous forest dominated by various species of spruce, fir, and larch.

At the westernmost section of the lake in Apgar there is a National Park Service visitor center with limited lodging and dining facilities. The lodge was constructed in 1913–14 to resemble a rustic hunting lodge with Swiss-influenced architecture.

McDonald Creek flows into and drains from the lake, and empties into the Middle Fork Flathead River shortly after.

References

External links

 
 

Lakes of Glacier National Park (U.S.)
Lakes of Flathead County, Montana